Church of St Mary the Virgin  is a  Grade I listed church in Wootton, Bedfordshire, England. It became a listed building on July 13, 1964.

The church is a member of the Evangelical Alliance and its Vicar is The Reverend Canon Doctor Peter Ackroyd.

See also
Grade I listed buildings in Bedfordshire

References

Church of England church buildings in Bedfordshire
Grade I listed churches in Bedfordshire